L. Jay Caldwell (June 19, 1871 – 1950) was an American football player and coach. He was the fourth head football coach at Colgate University and he held that position for two seasons, first in 1893 and then returning for 1895.  His overall coaching record at Colgate was 7–2–2. He was born in Ephratah, New York in 1871. He married May Thorne on July 20, 1904 in Jamaica, New York.

Caldwell later taught mathematics at a high school in Amsterdam, New York. In 1913, he was teaching at an Orange, New Jersey high school.

By the 1940 United States Census, Caldwell and his wife were retired and living in Shrewsbury, Massachusetts. He died there in 1950.

Racial integration
Caldwell coached the university's first African-American football player in 1895.  Unfortunately, no records were kept of the player's name, but a photograph (left) does exist.

Head coaching record

References

External links
 

1871 births
1950 deaths
19th-century players of American football
Colgate Raiders football coaches
Colgate Raiders football players
People from Fulton County, New York